Didier Lapeyronnie (29 April 1956 – 12 September 2020) was a French sociologist and a professor at Paris-Sorbonne University. He was an associate member Centre d'analyse et d'intervention sociologiques, and of the Groupe d'étude des méthodes de l'analyse sociologique de la Sorbonne.

Biography
Lapeyronnie served as a researcher at the French National Centre for Scientific Research from 1985 to 1992. He then became a professor of sociology at Bordeaux Segalen University. He served at Paris-Sorbonne University from 2007 until his death on 13 September 2020 at the age of 64.

Bibliography
L'État et les jeunes (1985)
Les Quartiers d'exil (1992)
Campus Blues. Les étudiants face à leurs études (1992)
L'Individu et les Minorités. La France et la Grande-Bretagne face à leurs immigrés (1993)
Le Grand Refus, réflexions sur la grève de décembre 1995 (1996)
Ghetto urbain. Ségrégation, violence, pauvreté en France aujourd'hui (2008)
Refaire la cité (2013)

References

1956 births
2020 deaths
French sociologists
French National Centre for Scientific Research scientists
Academic staff of Paris-Sorbonne University
People from Dordogne